DeLoss Dodds (born August 8, 1939) was the sixth men's athletic director of The University of Texas at Austin. 

During his tenure as AD from the fall of 1981 to November 2013, Texas won 19 National Championships and 287 conference titles. Dodds announced on October 1, 2013 that he would be retiring in 2014. Dodds became a special assistant to University of Texas President Bill Powers on November 25, 2013.

Biography
Dodds was born August 8, 1939 in Riley, Kansas. He is married to Mary Ann (née Chamberlain); they have two daughters, Deidre, and Debra and one son, Doug.
 He is a graduate of Kansas State University, where he was also a conference champion in the quarter mile in 1959.

Before taking his position at Texas, he was the athletic director for the Kansas State Wildcats for five years, from 1977 to 1981. Before that, Dodds was head track coach at Kansas State, a position he held from 1963 to 1976, during which time his teams captured two Big Eight Conference indoor track and field championships (1974 & 1976).

Dodds was hired in 1981 as the University of Texas' men’s athletic director. During his tenure he helped Texas through many major events, including the 2010–12 conference realignment frenzy and $380 million in athletic facility upgrades.

Achievements
 2011 Athletic Director of the Year 
 National Football Foundation and College Hall of Fame's John L. Toner Award in December 2006
 Inducted in the United States Track and Field and Cross Country Coaches Association Hall of Fame in 2006
 Inducted into the Drake Relays Coaches Hall of Fame in 1988
 Inducted into Kansas State Athletic Hall of Fame in 1995
 Inducted into the Texas Sports Hall of Fame in 2006

References

1939 births
Living people
American track and field coaches
Kansas State Wildcats men's track and field athletes
Kansas State Wildcats athletic directors
Kansas State Wildcats track and field coaches
Texas Longhorns athletic directors
People from Riley County, Kansas
Sportspeople from Kansas